Gradets ("small town") is a village in southeastern Bulgaria, part of Kotel municipality, Sliven Province. As of 2005, the mayor is the independent Venko Kavardzhikov, and the population of Gradets is 5,895, which makes it the second most populous village in Bulgaria, after Aydemir, Silistra Province, and the most populous in Bulgarian Thrace.

Gradets is situated in the Eastern Balkan Mountains, along the valley of the Luda Kamchiya. Gradets is characteristic because the vast majority of its residents are Bulgarian Roma (in 2000, 5,500 of 6,000 according to the then-mayor). In the early 20th century, Gradets had only around twenty Roma households, but their number later grew rapidly.

Notable natives include politician Petar Gudev (1862–1932), officer Radko Dimitriev (1859–1918) and Mustafa Shibil, a 19th-century Turkish Muslim Roma brigand who served as Yordan Yovkov's prototype for a hajduk character, as well as possibly the noted socialist Christian Rakovsky (1873–1941).

Gallery

References

Villages in Sliven Province
Romani communities in Bulgaria